The 1923 Stanford football team represented Stanford University in the 1923 college football season. They were coached by Andy Kerr in his second and final season as head coach. This year's Big Game against California was the first game played in California Memorial Stadium.

Schedule

References

Stanford
Stanford Cardinal football seasons
Stanford football